
Muotkavaara (Finnish name; Norwegian: Krokfjell;  or ,) is a hill in Lapland at the boundary between Finland, Norway and Russia. It is the second northernmost international tripoint in the world; the tripoint of Finland, Norway and Sweden is 900 metres closer  to the North. The Finnish side belongs to the Inari municipality, the Norwegian side belongs to Sør-Varanger and the Russian side belongs to Nikel.  The peak is in Norway.

The Sami name (muotke, myetki) refers to an isthmus between waters.

Tripoint cairn 
Treriksrøysa, a rock cairn at the tripoint  was erected in 1846.  A concrete tetrahedron was added on the top in 1945.

The border of Norway and Russia was demarcated in 1826, while Finland was an autonomous part of Russia.  Further in 1833 it was ruled that the border between Grand Duchy of Finland and Russia proper meets the Norwegian border at "Mutkavaara" (Muotkavaara).

Between 1920 and 1944, when Petsamo was part of Finland, there was no tripoint, since Norway and Russia did not share a border.  Muotkavaara became a tripoint again in 1944, when Finland ceded Petsamo to the Soviet Union in the Moscow Armistice.  The border was further modified in 1947 when Finland sold the Jäniskoski area to the Soviet Union.  Since then the border between Finland and Soviet Union (now Russia) is oriented to the south-west from the Muotkavaara tripoint.

The tripoint is most easily reached from Grensefoss on the Norwegian side, around 5 km hike each way.

Outdooring 
The Norwegian side of Muotkavaara is part of Øvre Pasvik National Park.  The Finnish side is slightly outside the Vätsäri Wilderness Area. There is a joint name for the contiguous natural reserve area: Pasvik–Inari Trilateral Park.
()

References 

Finland–Norway border
Finland–Russia border
Norway–Russia border
Border tripoints
Sør-Varanger